The Olympus E-620 is a Four Thirds digital single-lens reflex camera from Olympus announced February 24, 2009. It combines features of the E-420 (smaller size), E-520 (image stabilization), and E-30 (new 12.3 MP sensor, slightly larger viewfinder, fold-out LCD, newer AF sensor).

Features
The camera is marketed by Olympus as the world's smallest DSLR with built-in image stabilization (IS). It is 130 mm × 94 mm × 60 mm in size and weighs , body only ( with battery and a Compact Flash memory card).

As with all Four Thirds cameras it has a crop factor of 2.0.

Apart from being sold as camera body only, the E-620 is available with three lens configurations:
 The Zuiko 14–42 f/3.5–5.6 lens
 The 14–42 lens and the Zuiko 40–150 f/4–5.6 telephoto zoom
 The extremely compact 25 mm f/2.8 "pancake" lens

Unlike the E-420 and E-520 it has an Olympus-designed battery grip, HLD-5. The E-620 also has its own underwater housing, PT-E06, submersible down to 40 meters.

E-600
In August 2009 a slightly down-specced budget version of the E-620 was announced by Olympus, this model was called the E-600 and was available to the North American market only.  The features not present on the E-600 are the illuminated function buttons and all but four of the art filters, other than that the E600 is an E-620 and has gradually spread out of North America through grey imports of both new and used cameras and is often thought of as a better value option to the E-620.

Gallery

References

External links

Review at popphoto.com
Specifications at dpreview.com
dpreview news
Product page
Full-length camera review

Four Thirds System
E-620
Cameras introduced in 2009